Burwood was an electoral district of the Legislative Assembly in the Australian state of New South Wales named after and including the Sydney suburb of Burwood. It was originally created in 1894, when multi-member districts were abolished, and the four member Canterbury was largely divided between Ashfield, Burwood, Canterbury, Petersham and St George. In 1920, with the introduction of proportional representation, it was absorbed into Ryde, along with Drummoyne, Gordon and Willoughby. It was recreated in 1927, but was abolished in 1988 and partly replaced by Strathfield.

Members for Burwood

Election results

Notes

References

Former electoral districts of New South Wales
Constituencies established in 1894
Constituencies disestablished in 1920
Constituencies established in 1927
Constituencies disestablished in 1988
1894 establishments in Australia
1920 disestablishments in Australia
1927 establishments in Australia
1988 disestablishments in Australia